The Washington Huskies softball program is a college softball team that represents the University of Washington in the Pac-12 Conference in the National Collegiate Athletic Association. The team has had four head coaches (two were co-head coaches) since it started playing organized softball in the 1993 season.

Key

Coaches

Notes

References

Lists of college softball head coaches in the United States

Washington (state) sports-related lists